The Asian Universities Debating Championship (AUDC) was an annual debating tournament for teams from universities in Asia. It has now been replaced by the United Asian Debating Championships.

The championship was one of two major annual regional debating tournaments for Asian universities, the other being the All-Asian Intervarsity Debating Championships, both of which have now been joined together, for a combined and United Asian Debating Championships to take place in Assumption University, Bangkok. The AUDC was first held in 2005 as an alternative tournament to the All-Asian Championships, thus starting a schism in Asian debating.

Asian Universities Debating Union

The Asian Universities Debating Union was the executive body formed to govern the Asian Universities Debating Championship. The institutions who compete in the AUDC form the membership of the Union.

The Union also appointed an Executive Committee, the body authorized to discharge actions on behalf of the Union over the course of the year. This system has been adopted by the current avatar of the championships in united form. The current chair of the committee is Vikram Balasubramaniam, from Nanyang Technological University. Past chairpersons include Rajesh Krishnan (Nanyang Technological University), Shuvam Dutta (Singapore Management University), Leloy Claudio (Ateneo de Manila University) and Estelle Osorio (De La Salle University).

Controversy
Institutions who were unhappy about aspects of the organisation of the All-Asian Intervarsity Debating Championships established the Asian Universities Debating Championship in 2005 as an alternative to the All-Asians Championship. Since then, many universities in Asia with strong debating traditions – most notably universities from the Philippines and Singapore, including all except one of the institutions who won the All-Asian championships up to 2004 – have chosen not to participate in the All-Asian Intervarsity Championships and have instead entered teams in the Asian Universities Debating Championship.

While not necessarily intended to be a rival tournament, the last three AUDCs coincided with the schedule of the All-Asian Championship, which made it impracticable for teams to attend both tournaments.

Universiti Kebangsaan Malaysia, which was one of the founding institutions of AUDC and entered teams in the AUDC in 2005 and 2006, chose to attend the All-Asians Championship in 2007. Among the universities that won the All-Asians prior to the split, they are the only institution to have participated in the All-Asians since the inception of the AUDC. They attended AUDC again in 2008.

Past finalists and hosts

Future championships 
 2010 – to be hosted by Assumption University, Thailand, as the United Asian Debating Championships.

References

External links  
 AUDC Official Website
 AUDC Official E-group
 AUDC 2009 website
 AUDC 2008 website
 AUDC 2007 website

Asian debating competitions